is a Japanese football player. She plays for 1. FFC Turbine Potsdam in the German Frauen Bundesliga. She played for Japan national team.

Club career
Kyokawa was born in Omitama on December 28, 1993. After graduating from high school, she joined INAC Kobe Leonessa in 2012.

National team career
In 2010, Kyokawa was selected Japan U-17 national team for 2010 U-17 World Cup. She played 6 games and scored 3 goals. Japan won 2nd place. In February 2012, when she was 18 years old, she was selected Japan national team for 2012 Algarve Cup. At this competition, on February 29, she debuted against Norway. She played 5 games for Japan until 2015.

National team statistics

References

External links

Japan Football Association
INAC Kobe Leonessa

1993 births
Living people
Association football people from Ibaraki Prefecture
Japanese women's footballers
Japan women's international footballers
Nadeshiko League players
INAC Kobe Leonessa players
Women's association football forwards
Japanese expatriate women's footballers
Expatriate women's footballers in Germany
Japanese expatriate sportspeople in Germany